Seewald is a surname of German origin. Notable people with the surname include:

Jessa Duggar Seewald (born 1992), American television personality
Liesl Seewald, Austrian luger 
Willy Seewald (1900–1929), Brazilian athlete

References

Surnames of German origin